The Ministry of Emergency Management and Climate Readiness (EMCR), formerly Emergency Management BC (EMBC), is a provincial government department in the Canadian province of British Columbia. EMCR works with local governments and other provincial and federal agencies year round, providing coordination and support before, during and after emergencies. EMCR is administered under the Emergency Program Act.

EMCR has its headquarters in Victoria, British Columbia, and incorporates six regional offices throughout the province in Surrey, Kamloops, Nelson, Terrace, Prince George and Victoria.

The current minister is Bowinn Ma.

British Columbia Emergency Management System
The Province of British Columbia has developed and adopted the British Columbia Emergency Management System (BCEMS).

BCEMS is a comprehensive emergency management system based on the Incident Command System (ICS). This supports a coordinated and organized response and recovery to all emergency incidents and disasters.

Emergency management planning and response
Multi-agency hazard plans for B.C. are prepared and updated regularly by the province to ensure an effective strategy is in place to address many possible types of emergencies and disasters. These plans foster cooperation among multiple organizations. They focus on public safety, infrastructure and property protection and management of the aftermath of events.

British Columbia's comprehensive emergency management system promotes a coordinated and organized response to all emergency incidents and disasters. The structure provides the framework for a standardized emergency response in the province.

At the most fundamental level, it is up to the individual to know about the risks in their region and what to do in an emergency to protect themselves and their family. Everyone should be aware of the importance of Personal Emergency Preparedness.

Local governments lead the initial response to emergencies and disasters in their communities. They have emergency plans and maintain an emergency management organization to support the actions of first responders.

The provincial emergency management structure is activated when a B.C. community or any significant infrastructure is threatened by an emergency or disaster that may require additional or specialized resources.

Disaster Financial Assistance
British Columbia has a program to help those impacted by a disaster cope with the cost of repairs and recovery from disaster-related property damage.

The Disaster Financial Assistance Program (DFA) is administered through EMCR under the authority of the Compensation and Disaster Financial Assistance Regulation.

Those impacted by a disaster may apply to the province for Disaster Financial Assistance (DFA) where the losses could not be insured or where other programs are not available. Disaster financial assistance helps to replace or restore essential items and property that have been destroyed or damaged to pre-disaster condition.

Assistance is available to qualifying home owners, residential tenants, small businesses, farm operators, and not-for-profit charitable organizations.

Public safety
About 13,000 people across the province volunteer their time and expertise in preparing for and responding to emergency situations. EMCR provides support for many volunteers and also provides the essential legal authority to recognized volunteer groups in responding to emergencies and disasters. Registered public safety lifeline volunteers are eligible for some benefits and basic response expenses. There is additional support available in the way of coordination and training.

Emergency volunteers come from every corner of the province and from all walks of life. Public safety lifeline volunteers respond to an average of 6,000 incidents a year, in all kinds of weather, any place, any time.

Emergency Support Services

Emergency Support Services (previously knows as Emergency Social Services) provides short-term assistance to British Columbians who are forced to leave their homes because of fire, floods, earthquakes or other emergencies. This assistance includes food, lodging, clothing, emotional support and family reunification.

Ground Search and Rescue
Annually, Search and Rescue volunteers in BC respond to over 1000 searches province-wide. Volunteer responders donate over 120,000 hours of their time on callouts and recent statistics show an astounding 95% of the subjects were found.

Search and rescue is further broken down into individual teams what operate in an area of the province where they are responsible for familiarity and access (e.g., North Shore Rescue). They may be tasked from a variety of agencies such as the Royal Canadian Mounted Police, local police force, BC Ambulance, or the Coroner's service, and can be called to assist the Coast Guard, Department of National Defence, and Parks Canada. A number of search and rescue teams in BC are also trained and equipped for using the Helicopter Flight Rescue System to aid in rescuing people from dangerous or remote terrain.

In 2005 there were 93 individual SAR teams in the province, comprising approximately 4700 volunteers, and conducting an average of 900 operations per year, locating an average of 1200 people per year.

EMBC-affiliated ground SAR teams in BC are represented by the British Columbia Search and Rescue Association, as well as by their individual teams.

Royal Canadian Marine Search and Rescue

In 2017, EMBC signed a memorandum of understanding with the Royal Canadian Marine Search and Rescue (RCMSAR), which allows for provincial and local response agencies to access humanitarian assistance from RCMSAR in coastal and inland waterways. As a core function, RCMSAR responds to over 800 SAR missions annually from its 33 volunteer lifeboat stations. RCMSAR comprises over 1,100 volunteers and a small cadre of paid staff.

Provincial Emergency Program Air Search & Rescue
PEP Air's primary function is to assist Canadian Forces during search and rescue missions when additional resources are required. Currently, the organization includes over 100 aircraft crewed by more than 700 pilots, spotters and navigators.

BC Road Rescue Service
BC Road Rescue is an organized service with members who may be requested to provide support to people involved in out-of-jurisdiction motor vehicle accidents where specialized skills and equipment are required.

Emergency radio communications
During disasters and other serious emergency situations, when many other systems fail, a proven reliable means of communication has been emergency radio communications, notably Amateur Radio or "ham" radio. Emergency radio is a public safety lifeline that assists within the community and links the community in crisis to where relief and support can be coordinated.

Volunteers' powers, privileges and recognition
 Volunteers are allowed to use the Disaster Response Route when on duty
 Under Section 27(1b) of the Emergency Program Act, a person commits an offence who interferes with or obstructs any person in the exercise of any power or the performance of any duty conferred or imposed by this Act or the regulations is liable to imprisonment for a term of not more than one year or to a fine of not more than $10 000 or to both imprisonment and fine.
 Civil Liability Exemption under Section 18 of the Emergency Program Act
 WorkSafeBC coverage
 The BC government maintains a comprehensive general liability insurance policy with a limit of $2 million covering all provincial volunteers
 Good Samaritan Act applies to all volunteers (unless grossly negligent)
 SAR training program administration and coordination through a grant of $250K to the Justice Institute of BC.

See also
Interagency Volcanic Event Notification Plan
E-Comm

References

External links

BC Links
Emergency Management BC
PreparedBC
BC Provincial SAR
Emergency Program Act
Royal Canadian Marine Search and Rescue

Canadian Links
 Public Safety Canada Emergency preparedness
 Alberta Emergency Management Agency
 Saskatchewan Emergency Management Organization
 Manitoba Emergency Measures Organization
 Emergency Management Ontario
 Ministère de la Sécurité publique du Québec (MSP) (Department of Public Security, Québec)
 New Brunswick Emergency Measures Organization
 Nova Scotia Emergency Measures Organization
 Prince Edward Island Emergency Measures Organization
 Fire and Emergency Services – Newfoundland and Labrador
 Northwest Territories Ministry of Municipal and Community Affairs
 Nunavut Emergency Management
 Yukon Emergency Measures Organization

Emergency management in Canada
Safety organizations
British Columbia government departments and agencies
Organizations based in Victoria, British Columbia